Eslamabad (1) (also Romanized as Eslāmābād (1); also known as Eslāmābād) is a village in Qaleh Rural District, in the Central District of Manujan County, Kerman Province, Iran. At the 2006 census, its population was 102, in 23 families.

References 

Populated places in Manujan County